Frederick Albert Gross (17 September 1902 – 11 March 1975) was an English first-class cricketer. A right-handed batsman who bowled leg break and googly, he made his first-class debut for Hampshire against Sussex in the 1924 County Championship. Gross represented Hampshire in 34 first-class matches for Hampshire from 1924 to 1929. Gross' final appearance for the county came against Yorkshire. Gross took 50 wickets for Hampshire at a bowling average of 37.76, with best figures of 5/53, which was Gross' only five wicket haul.

Gross represented Warwickshire in a single first-class match in 1934 against Yorkshire, where he took a single wicket.

Gross died at Birmingham, Warwickshire on 11 March 1975.

External links
Frederick Gross at Cricinfo
Frederick Gross at CricketArchive
Matches and detailed statistics for Frederick Gross

1902 births
1975 deaths
Cricketers from Southampton
English cricketers
Hampshire cricketers
Warwickshire cricketers
People from South Stoneham